This is a list of all familial relations in professional sports.

Parents and children

Couples

See also
List of family relations in American football
List of association football families
List of Australian rules football families
List of boxing families
List of chess families
List of International cricket families
List of second-generation Major League Baseball players
List of second-generation National Basketball Association players
List of family relations in the NHL
List of family relations in rugby league
List of international rugby union families
List of professional wrestling families

References

External links
 Europe's ultimate footballing families